Feni Gas Field is a natural gas field at Feni, Bangladesh. It is a subsidiary of a Canadian multinational company, Niko.

Location
Feni gas field is located at Dhliya union of Sadar upazila of Feni district of Chittagong Division.

Discovery
Petrobangla discovered the gas field in 1981.

See also 
List of natural gas fields in Bangladesh
Bangladesh Gas Fields Company Limited
Gas Transmission Company Limited

References 

1981 establishments in Bangladesh
Economy of Chittagong
Natural gas fields in Bangladesh